The City of Canterbury was a local government area in the southwest region of Sydney, New South Wales, Australia. The city was primarily residential and light industrial in character, and was home to over 130 nationalities. With a majority of its residents being born overseas, the council marketed itself as the "City of Cultural Diversity." First incorporated as the Municipality of Canterbury in 1879, the council became known as the City of Canterbury in 1993.

The last Mayor of the City of Canterbury Council was Cr. Brian Robson, a member of the Labor Party, until 12 May 2016 when the City was amalgamated with the City of Bankstown, forming the City of Canterbury-Bankstown.

Suburbs in the local government area
Suburbs in the former City of Canterbury were:
 

 Ashbury 
 Belfield 
 Belmore
 Beverly Hills 
 Campsie
 Canterbury
 Clemton Park
 Croydon Park 
 Earlwood

 Hurlstone Park 
 Kingsgrove 
 Lakemba
 Narwee 
 Punchbowl 
 Riverwood 
 Roselands
 Wiley Park

Notes

History

Indigenous Australians lived in this area for thousands of years. In 1770, the land along the Cooks River was explored by officers from HM Bark Endeavour. In 1793, the area's first land grant was made to the chaplain of the First Fleet, the Reverend Richard Johnson, and given the name Canterbury Vale.

A leading developer at this time was Frederick Gibbes, a Member of Parliament for the seat of Newtown.

After much petitioning of the State Government by local residents, the Municipality of Canterbury was proclaimed on 17 March 1879. The council first met in the home of the first mayor, Alderman John Sproule and premised were then leased in the St Paul's Church schoolroom at 47-49 Canterbury Road, Canterbury. The Canterbury Town Hall, located on Canterbury Road between Canton and Howard Streets, was opened in 1889 by the Premier of New South Wales, Sir Henry Parkes. However, over time, Campsie became a more important centre, particularly along Beamish Street and Canterbury Council planned a gradual move of civic services there when funds became available. In 1954 a Baby Health Centre by Davey & Brindley opened on Beamish Street, followed by a library next door by Davey, Brindley & Vickery in 1958 at a cost of £30,000, and the municipal administration finally moved in 1963. At the time of its opening by the mayor R. J. Schofield on 26 September 1958, the Campsie Library was reputed to be the largest municipal library in Sydney. The Canterbury Municipal Administration Building designed by architects Whitehead & Payne, built by Rex Building Company Pty Ltd, and completed at a cost of £163,000 was opened adjacent to the Library and Baby Health Centre by the mayor, James S. Scott, on 21 September 1963. The City of Canterbury was proclaimed on 16 November 1993 by the Governor of New South Wales, Rear Admiral Peter Sinclair.

Amalgamation 

Council dysfunction and ICAC Operation Dasha

On 26 March 2018, the NSW Independent Commission Against Corruption (ICAC) commenced investigations and a public inquiry (known as Operation Dasha) into allegations concerning actions of the former Canterbury City Council between 2013 and 2016, "where public officials including councillors Michael Hawatt and Pierre Azzi, the former general manager, Jim Montague, and the former Director City Planning, Spiro Stavis, dishonestly and/or partially exercised their official functions in relation to planning proposals and/or applications under the Environmental Planning and Assessment Act 1979 concerning properties in the Canterbury City Council local area."

Among the decisions Stavis presided over were the variations of Council's controls approved by Council and justified under Section 4.6 of the Environmental Planning and Assessment Act 1979, particularly along the Canterbury Road Corridor. With the appointment of Administrator Richard Colley as head of the new City of Canterbury-Bankstown on 12 May 2016, Colley ordered a halt to development proposals along the corridor until a comprehensive review was completed, noting "One of the first things that I came across following the amalgamation was what I saw as the ad hoc development on Canterbury Road, most of it non-compliant with the former Canterbury Council's residential development strategy, particularly in terms of height and bulk and size, and the effect on Canterbury Road itself". Former mayor Brian Robson admitted that the last 2012-2016 Council term "started getting messy with certain councillors trying to push the barrow of individual developers ... after that we started getting messy with individual spot rezonings."

The review report presented to Council in July 2017 declared that as a result of previous actions taken by the former Council, the Canterbury Road Corridor "is a noisy, polluted and harsh environment, generally unsuitable in its current state for housing" and presented 14 recommendations including: Appropriate zoning, urban design and built-form controls along the corridor; Measures to address environmental issues, such as noise and pollution; Traffic, transport and car parking issues; Providing good access to parks, community facilities, public transport and shops; and completing a new city-wide Local Environmental Plan (LEP) by 2020, to guide all development. All the recommendations were subsequently adopted by Council, with the Canterbury Bankstown Mayor, Khal Asfour, noting on Council's rejection of one planning proposal in the corridor: "This kind of development won’t be approved on my watch, this proposal involved rezoning land reserved for employment to build an eight-storey residential complex, which would have been an inappropriate development for that location. We remain committed to our City and its residents. We will consult them and protect them from overdevelopment, and make no apology for that."

ICAC also undertook investigations into the circumstances surrounding the appointment of Stavis as Director City Planning, and whether he had been appointed through a dishonest and politically-motivated process influenced by Councillors Hawatt and Azzi. The public inquiry heard evidence that the previous Director had resigned following sustained pressure by Hawatt and Azzi over decisions on certain development applications, and they had pressured Montague in accepting Stavis as the acceptable candidate as Director, when he was not the most qualified for the position compared to other candidates, to the point of "blackmail and threats". This included an aborted attempt by Hawatt and Azzi to dismiss Montague from his position as General Manager in a Council Meeting in January 2015, amidst allegations that "Montague had spent more than $42,000 of council funds on lunches over the past five years and that he had mishandled the recent employment of the council's new director of city planning."

In July 2018, the Liberal Member of Parliament for Wagga Wagga, Daryl Maguire, was drawn into the inquiry regarding possible corruption through his association with former Liberal councillor Hawatt. It was alleged that Maguire had acted on behalf of a "mega big" Chinese client, asking for help in buying into development-approved projects, in return for a commission from the developer for both himself and Hawatt. As a consequence, Maguire resigned from the Liberal Party, and from his roles Parliamentary Secretary for the Centenary of ANZAC, Counter Terrorism, Corrections and Veterans. After initially refusing to resign from Parliament, Maguire resigned from parliament on 3 August 2018.

The ICAC investigations for 'Operation Dasha' are ongoing. In March 2017 Administrator Richard Colley adopted a new Code of Conduct for Canterbury Bankstown noting: "Honesty, fairness and transparency are the values underpinning our new council’s code of conduct policies, ensuring residents can be confident the decisions we make are in their best interest". The Code of Conduct was the first in the state to be approved by ICAC.

Council

Final composition and election method
Canterbury City Council was composed of ten Councillors, including the Mayor, elected for a fixed four-year term of office. The Mayor was directly elected since 1976 while the nine other Councillors were elected proportionally as three separate wards, each electing three Councillors. The final election was held on 8 September 2012, and the makeup of the Council, prior to its abolition, was as follows:

The last Council, elected in 2012 until its abolition in 2016, in order of election by ward, was:

Mayors and General Managers

Mayors

Town Clerk/General Managers

Demographics 
At the 2011 Census, there were  people in the Canterbury local government area, with an equal proportion of male and female residents. Aboriginal and Torres Strait Islander people made up 0.6% of the population. The median age of people in the City of Canterbury was 35 years. Children aged 0 – 14 years made up 20.0% of the population and people aged 65 years and over made up 13.5% of the population. of people in the area aged 15 years and over, 52.9% were married and 10.8% were either divorced or separated.

Population growth in the City of Canterbury between the 2001 Census and the 2006 Census was 0.02%; and in the subsequent five years to the 2011 Census, population growth was 5.76%. When compared with total population growth of Australia for the same periods, being 5.78% and 8.32% respectively, population growth in Canterbury local government area was approximately half the national average. The median weekly income for residents within the City of Canterbury is significantly lower than the national average.

Coat of arms and logo

Logo
In 1990, the council's Engineering Department produced the logo in everyday usage until 2016, it consisted of two C's in black and white, intersected by a wave in light blue, which represents the Cooks River and is taken from the council arms issued in 1979.

Sister cities
  Eunpyong-gu, Seoul, South Korea. A special friendship garden in Loft Gardens at Campsie commemorating the relationship begun in 1988, in the design of the Taegukgi, was unveiled in November 2000 by the mayors of Canterbury and Eunpyong-gu.
  Patras, Greece.

References

External links 
 Canterbury City Council website
 History of Canterbury City Wiki
 Pictorial Canterbury

Canterbury
Canterbury
Canterbury
Lists of local government leaders of places in New South Wales
City of Canterbury-Bankstown